State Route 252 (SR 252) is a primary state highway in the U.S. state of Virginia. The state highway runs  from SR 39 near Rockbridge Baths north to U.S. Route 250, US 11 Business, and SR 254 in Staunton. SR 252 passes through rural areas of the upper Shenandoah Valley of northern Rockbridge County and western Augusta County.

Route description

SR 252 begins at an acute intersection with SR 39 (Maury River Road) just east of the Maury River near Rockbridge Baths. The state highway heads northeast as two-lane undivided Brownsburg Turnpike, which passes through the village of Brownsburg. SR 252 veers north at SR 606 (Raphine Road), which leads to the historic Kennedy-Wade Mill, and follows Moffatts Creek into Augusta County, where the highway becomes Middlebrook Road. The state highway follows the creek northeast through the village of Newport to its headwaters. Moffatts Creek's source is just south of Middlebrook at the drainage divide between the James River watershed and the Shenandoah River watershed. SR 252 has a partial cloverleaf interchange with SR 262 (Woodrow Wilson Parkway), a circumferential highway around Staunton, before entering the independent city. The state highway follows Middlebrook Avenue to the downtown area, where it passes under CSX's North Mountain Subdivision. SR 262 turns north onto Lewis Street, then east onto Beverley Street, a one-way street that carries eastbound SR 254. Westbound SR 254 follows Frederick Street one block to the north. SR 252 and SR 254 run concurrently two blocks east to SR 252's northern terminus at Augusta Street, which hosts eastbound US 250 and southbound US 11 Business. Westbound US 250 and northbound US 11 Business are accessed at New Street one block to the east.

Major intersections

References

External links

Virginia Highways Project: VA 252

252
State Route 252
State Route 252
State Route 252